The 2011 Coupe Internationale de Nice was the 16th edition of an annual international figure skating competition held in Nice, France. It was held on October 26–30, 2011. Skaters competed in the disciplines of men's singles, ladies' singles, pair skating, and ice dancing on the senior and junior levels.

Entries

Senior results

Men

Ladies

Pairs

Ice dancing

Junior results

Men

Ladies

References

External links
 Entries/Results
 Coupe de Nice

Coupe Internationale de Nice
Coupe Internationale De Nice, 2011
Coupe Internationale de Nice